John Eugene "Gene" Martin (lifespan unknown) was an American professional baseball player, manager, scout, and front-office executive who served as farm system and scouting director and player personnel adviser of the Philadelphia Phillies of Major League Baseball between  and .

Prior to joining the Phillies, Martin was a scouting supervisor and minor league manager  in the New York Yankees organization. In , he led the Binghamton Triplets to the championship of the Class A Eastern League.

Martin served in the U.S. Navy in WWI.

References

Baseball executives
Binghamton Triplets managers
Philadelphia Phillies executives
New York Yankees scouts
Philadelphia Phillies scouts
Major League Baseball farm directors
Major League Baseball scouting directors
Year of birth missing
Year of death missing